The Suomi-sarja is Finland's third-highest ice hockey league. Suomi-sarja has 14 teams. Suomi-sarja has been played since the 1999–2000 season. Prior to this, Finland's third league had been Division II since 1975 and before that the Provincial Series since 1947. During the 1990s the series also included an Estonian team. The series was played in two segments in the 2006–2007 season. During the 2007–2008 season there were four divisions. Teams playing in the Suomi-sarja can be relegated to the 2. Divisioona or promoted to Mestis.

During the 2022–23 season, there are 13 teams. The eight best teams continue to the playoffs and the worst two teams play in the qualifiers against 2. divisioona teams. The Suomi-sarja champion and the runner-up advance to Mestis qualifiers.

Suomi-sarja medalists

Teams 2022–23 
Teams playing in Suomi-sarja in 2022–2023 season:

References

 
Fin
Professional ice hockey leagues in Finland